Tosanoumi Toshio (born February 16, 1972 as Toshio Yamamoto in Aki City, Kōchi Prefecture, Japan), is a former sumo wrestler. He first reached the top division of professional sumo in 1995, winning 13 special prizes and earning 11 kinboshi or gold stars for defeating  yokozuna over his long career. The highest rank he reached was sekiwake. He retired in 2010 to become a coach at his stable, Isenoumi stable under the name of Tatekawa.

Career
After success in amateur sumo competitions while at Doshisha University, where he was a two-time winner of the All Western Japan Sumo Championships in 1992 and 1993, Yamamoto was recruited by former sekiwake Fujinokawa and joined Isenoumi stable. He was given the shikona of Tosanoumi, meaning "sea of Tosa", from his native Kōchi Prefecture. Because of his amateur achievements he had makushita tsukedashi status and entered professional sumo in the third, makushita division in March 1994.  He entered jūryō four tournaments later. Another four tournaments later he was promoted to the highest, makuuchi division. Because he had won the yūshō or tournament championship with a 14–1 record from the rank of jūryō 1, he entered at maegashira 7, the second highest top division debut rank after Daiju in 1970. For his first makuuchi bouts he was drawn against some tough opponents; first ōzeki Wakanohana, followed by yokozuna Takanohana the second day. He lost both bouts, and would finish the tournament 7–8.

Recovering from this, his first ever make-koshi, Tosanoumi continued to rise through the ranks, reaching komusubi in January 1996 and sekiwake in May 1997. His best result in a tournament came in November 1998, when he finished as runner-up to Kotonishiki with 12 wins. Although he never rose higher than sekiwake, he held the rank for seven tournaments in total, the last being in May 2005. He was also ranked at komusubi on thirteen occasions, for a total of twenty tournaments in the san'yaku ranks. He remained in makuuchi continuously from July 1995 until January 2006, when a 5–10 result at maegashira 14 resulted in demotion to jūryō. He reappeared in makuuchi just two tournaments later in May 2006, but remained at the bottom of the division. He fell to jūryō on three further occasions, in May 2007, March 2008 and September 2008, but each time made an immediate return to the top division.

Tosanoumi won a total of thirteen prizes (equal to the seventh highest ever) and eleven gold stars (the fourth highest ever) in his long makuuchi career. He defeated two yokozuna in the same tournament on four separate occasions. He earned four gold stars from Takanohana, and three each from Wakanohana and Akebono. He is the only wrestler to win kinboshi in four consecutive tournaments, which he achieved from November 1998 to May 1999. His last gold star came in 2003 when he beat Musashimaru, in what was the latter's last bout before retirement. In July 2007 he recorded his 600th career win, which came by default when his opponent withdrew. Tosanoumi is tenth on the all-time list of most top division appearances with 1183, and he had 80 tournaments ranked in the top division.

He became the oldest active sekitori after the March 2009 tournament following the retirement of Ōtsukasa. However, he was unable to maintain his makuuchi position, dropping to jūryō 6 after winning only four matches at Maegashira 15. An 8–7 record in May was not enough to return him to the top division this time. He could manage only a 5–10 score in July, his first ever jūryō make-koshi. He recorded his 700th career win in the January 2010 tournament, the first makushita tsukedashi entrant to achieve this feat.

Following the large number of demotions to the jūryō division in September 2010 after six wrestlers were suspended from competition he made a surprise return to the top division, becoming at 38 years and six months the oldest man ever to do so (this record has since been broken by Aminishiki). He was however out of his depth and scored only 2–13, resulting in demotion straight back to jūryō.

Retirement from sumo
In November 2010 Tosanoumi could score only 4–11 at jūryō 8, which would have resulted in demotion to the makushita division. This broke a run of 97 consecutive tournaments at a sekitori rank. Instead Tosanoumi chose to retire, announcing his decision on December 15 shortly before the release of the new rankings. He has stayed in sumo as a coach at Isenoumi stable under the toshiyori name Tatekawa, and his danpatsu-shiki or official retirement ceremony took place at the Ryōgoku Kokugikan on May 28, 2011.

Fighting style
Tosanoumi's fighting style was solidly oshi-sumo, using pushing and thrusting techniques as opposed to yotsu-sumo or grappling techniques. He has attributed his relative lack of injuries during his career in part to this preference.  Over 30 percent of his wins in sumo were oshi-dashi, a simple push out.

Family
Tosanoumi announced in September 2008 that he would be getting married. The wedding reception and ceremony were held in January 2009.

Career record

See also
Glossary of sumo terms
List of sumo record holders
List of sumo tournament top division runners-up
List of sumo tournament second division champions
List of past sumo wrestlers
List of sumo elders
List of sekiwake

References

External links

 Tosanoumi's basho results
 Complete biography and basho results (Japanese)

1972 births
Living people
Japanese sumo wrestlers
Sumo people from Kōchi Prefecture
Sekiwake
Doshisha University alumni